Neil James Robbins (8 September 1929 – 6 December 2020) was an Australian steeplechase and long-distance runner. He competed in the six-mile run at the 1954 British Empire and Commonwealth Games and in the 3000 metres steeplechase at the 1956 Summer Olympics.

References

External links
 

1929 births
2020 deaths
Athletes (track and field) at the 1954 British Empire and Commonwealth Games
Athletes (track and field) at the 1956 Summer Olympics
Australian male long-distance runners
Australian male steeplechase runners
Olympic athletes of Australia
Place of birth missing
Commonwealth Games competitors for Australia
20th-century Australian people